Vũ Thành An (born 7 August 1992) is a Vietnamese fencer. He was chosen to compete for Vietnam at the 2016 Summer Olympics in Rio de Janeiro, where he was the flag-bearer for Vietnam at the opening ceremony. At the Olympic Games in Rio, he defeated Diego Occhiuzzi of Italy in the first round of the men's sabre competition, 15-12. He was then defeated by Vincent Anstett of France in the round of 16.

References

External links
 

1992 births
Living people
Vietnamese male fencers
Fencers at the 2016 Summer Olympics
Olympic fencers of Vietnam
Fencers at the 2014 Asian Games
Fencers at the 2018 Asian Games
Southeast Asian Games gold medalists for Vietnam
Southeast Asian Games silver medalists for Vietnam
Southeast Asian Games medalists in fencing
Competitors at the 2011 Southeast Asian Games
Competitors at the 2015 Southeast Asian Games
Competitors at the 2017 Southeast Asian Games
Asian Games competitors for Vietnam
Competitors at the 2019 Southeast Asian Games
Sportspeople from Hanoi
Competitors at the 2021 Southeast Asian Games
20th-century Vietnamese people
21st-century Vietnamese people